Haltya is a musical act by Finnish born musician and sound artist Tommi Sirkiä. The band was founded in the mid-nineties by Tommi and former member Jürgen Sachau in Helsinki Finland. Tommi and Jürgen parted ways after the release of Haltya's 2nd studio album :fi:Electric Help Elves, and today Tommi records and produces Haltya mainly on his own, often with the help of other musicians, artists and producers.
 
Haltya released their first studio recording on :fi:Exogenic Records in 1999 in the form of Project Haltya EP, and received very good feedback and club plays from, among others, Annie Nightingale at BBC Radio One. Their debut studio album Forest Flavor, which came out in 2000, was highly acclaimed by psychedelic electronic music lovers around the world, introducing a new fresh approach to sound imagination at that time. Their musical style took influences from jazz, funk, trance, house, drum n bass and all sorts of other musical directions. The result was seriously booty shaking funky forest music with sparkles on top, the trademark of Haltya.

In late 2003 Haltya released the studio EP Hero, which made way for the following album Electric Help Elves, released 2004. Featuring the well known Finnish horn section baabelin torvet, a remix for Hidria Spacefolk, combining new elements and live instruments to their sound. The music is groovy, blends in unconventional psytrance instruments like guitars & horns and is best described as Funky Forest Trance.

Borboleta Purpura, Haltya's 3rd studio EP, was released in 2007. It featured a slightly new sound direction as Tommi was influenced by having lived and playing at parties in Brazil at that time. The EP was recorded at mothership space station studios in Helsinki, the studio what would become home to numerous other side project releases incl. the double studio album for the band Headphonics, and Highpersonic Whomen's 2nd album.

Haltya's 3rd studio album titled Book of Nature released in 2008, featured a more focused approach to song structure and form, alongside collaborations with other musicians and producers. Discussing the sound and process of creating this studio album, Tommi says "it was written and recorded during my journey's around the world, having visited and produced music in so many amazing places, having met so many interesting people, this album was a global process for me."

Today Haltya is considered to be one of the pioneers of electronic, funkedelic, and psychedelic music; as well as being a mainstay in Finnish Suomisaundi.

Haltya has been heard at various parties in countries around the world during their numerous live gigs and dj sets. Aside from Finland, Haltya have played live gigs in Israel, Austria, United States, Turkey, Russia, Brazil, Germany, Denmark, Australia, Ukraine  amongst other countries in the world.

The name Haltya comes from the Finnish word haltija, which is for elf, or female spirit with wings. It is basically a faerie spirit, although in the old Finnish mythology haltija can be almost anything. It was believed that a person consists of many spirits, haltijas.

Discography
Project Haltya EP (Exogenic Records 2000)
Forest Flavour (Exogenic Records 2001)
Hero EP (Exogenic Records 2003)
Electric Help Elves (Exogenic Records 2004)
Borboleta Purpura EP (Exogenic Records 2007)
Book Of Nature (Exogenic Records 2008)

References

External links
 Haltya.info
 Haltya at Facebook
 Haltya at SoundCloud
 Haltya at Bandcamp
 Haltya at Myspace
 Haltya at Discogs
 
 [ Haltya] at Allmusic

Finnish musical groups
Psychedelic trance musical groups
Suomisaundi